Thomas Lockwood may refer to:

 Thomas B. Lockwood (1873–1947), American lawyer, banker, politician, and philanthropist
 Thomas Meakin Lockwood (1830–1900), English architect
 Thomas William Lockwood (1863–?), English-born rugby union player for Wales
 Thomas Lockwood (priest) (died 1565), Archdeacon of Kells
 T. Firth Lockwood, Sr. (1868–1920), American architect
 T. Firth Lockwood, Jr. (1894–1963), American architect